

Maw may refer to:

Biology
 A human's or animal's stomach or gullet, a bird's crop
 A fish's gas bladder (swim bladder)
 Abomasum, the fourth stomach of a ruminant

Games
 Maw (game), a card game
The Maw, a 2009 video game
The Maw, the main setting of the video game Little Nightmares
Maw, a character in the video game My Singing Monsters

People with the surname
 Carlyle E. Maw (1903–1987), American lawyer and politician 
 Herbert B. Maw (1893–1990), American politician
 Nicholas Maw (1935–2009), British composer
 William Maw (1838–1924), British civil engineer

Other
 Scottish and North American slang for "mother"
 Maw (state), one of the Shan states of Southeast Asia 
 Maw language (disambiguation)
 Mace (bludgeon), a weapon
 Maw & Co, British manufacturer of ceramic tiles

See also
MAW (disambiguation)
Mawe (disambiguation)